The 2011 FIFA U-17 World Cup was the fourteenth (14th) tournament of the FIFA U-17 World Cup, and the eleventh played since the emergence of a change in age limits, which from under 16s was changed to under 17s in the year 1991. It was held in Mexico with games being played amongst various venues between 18 June and 10 July 2011. Mexico won the Cup, beinty the first team to achieve it as hosts defeating Uruguay 2–0 and managing their second title in the category.

It was confirmed by the 58th FIFA Congress in Sydney,  Australia that Mexico would be the host, beating other bids from the Czech Republic and Iran.

Player eligibility
Only players born on or after 1 January 1994 were eligible to compete in the 2011 FIFA U-17 World Cup.

Venues
After having won the right to host the 2011 FIFA U-17 World Cup, Femexfut president, Justino Compéan, stated during an interview from Sydney, Australia, that the Estadio Corona, in Torreón, would be one of the venues, arguing that recently built or invested stadia would have a major preference. He also mentioned Monterrey, Ciudad Juárez, Querétaro, Tijuana, Pachuca and Aguascalientes as other possible venues.

The Estadio Azteca in Mexico City, after having previously hosted major events, such as 1970 and 1986 FIFA World Cup, 1983 FIFA World Youth Championship, 1999 FIFA Confederations Cup and 1968 Summer Olympics Football final matches, hosted the third place match and the final match of the tournament.

Teams 

In addition to host nation Mexico, 23 nations qualified from 6 separate continental competitions.

1.Teams that made their debut.
2.Czech Republic made their debut as independent nation. The now-defunct Czechoslovakia qualified for their only appearance in 1993.

Match officials

Squads

Group stage 
The draw for the group stage took place on 17 May 2011 at the Universidad Nacional Autónoma de México's Sala Nezahualcóyotl concert Hall.
The seeding was as follows:

The winners and runners-up from each group, as well as the best four third-placed teams, qualified for the first round of the knockout stage (round of 16).

Tie-breaking criteria
Where two or more teams end the group stage with the same number of points, their ranking is determined by the following criteria:

 goal difference in all group matches;
 number of goals scored in all group matches;
 points earned in the matches between the teams concerned;
 goal difference in the matches between the teams concerned;
 number of goals scored in the group matches between the teams concerned;
 drawing of lots by the organising committee.

Ranking of third place teams in each group are determined by the following criteria, top four advances to the round of 16:

 number of points
 goal difference in all group matches;
 number of goals scored in all group matches;
 drawing of lots by the organising committee.

All kick-off times are local (UTC−05:00).

Group A

Group B

Group C 

 Roberts' goal for Canada marked the first time a goalkeeper had scored in any FIFA finals tournament.

Group D 

Drawing of lots was used to determine the final positions of the United States and New Zealand, as the two teams finished level on points, goal difference, goals scored, and head-to-head record.

Group E

Group F 

 The game was originally played on 26 June 2011 (kickoff 18:00), but was suspended after 25 minutes due to heavy downpour and lightning (with Denmark leading 1–0 on an 11th-minute goal by Viktor Fischer). Following an hour and a half delay in which the conditions did not improve, the Organising Committee for the FIFA U-17 World Cup decided to abandon the match and replay it in its entirety (starting from 0–0) the next day, 27 June 2011 (kickoff 10:00), at the same venue, Estadio Corregidora in Querétaro.

Ranking of third-placed teams

Knockout stage
In a rule to avoid potential "player burnout", all games in the knockout stage proceeded straight to penalties if tied after normal time, thus avoiding the need for 30 minutes of extra time.

Round of 16

Quarter-finals

Semi-finals

Third-place match

Final

Awards

Winners

Individual awards

Team statistics

Goalscorers
9 goals
 Souleymane Coulibaly

6 goals
 Samed Yeşil

5 goals

 Ademilson
 Adryan
 Yassine Benzia

4 goals

 Okan Aydın
 Carlos Fierro

3 goals

 Levent Ayçiçek
 Koray Günter
 Mitchell Weiser
 Fumiya Hayakawa
 Hideki Ishige
 Giovani Casillas
 Julio Gómez
 Stephen Carmichael
 Timur Khakimov
 Abbosbek Makhstaliev

2 goals

 Léo
 Lukáš Juliš
 José Francisco Cevallos
 Hallam Hope
 Raheem Sterling
 Marvin Ducksch
 Jonathan Espericueta
 Jorman Aguilar
 Elbio Álvarez
 Guillermo Méndez
 Alfred Koroma

1 goal

 Brian Ferreira
 Maximiliano Padilla
 Lucas Pugh
 Jonathan Silva
 Jesse Makarounas
 Luke Remington
 Dylan Tombides
 Lucas Piazon
 Wallace
 Wellington
 Sadi Jalali
 Quillan Roberts
 Hardy Binguila
 Bel-Ange Epako
 Moïse Nkounkou
 Christ Nkounkou
 Drissa Diarrassouba
 Viktor Fischer
 Lee Rochester Sørensen
 Kenneth Zohore
 Carlos Gruezo
 Jordan Jaime
 Kevin Mercado
 Nathaniel Chalobah
 Max Clayton
 Sam Magri
 Adam Morgan
 Blair Turgott
 Sébastien Haller
 Jordan Ikoko
 Lenny Nangis
 Abdallah Yaisien
 Kaan Ayhan
 Emre Can
 Cimo Röcker
 Zhelano Barnes
 Andre Lewis
 Hiroki Akino
 Masaya Matsumoto
 Takumi Minamino
 Shoya Nakajima
 Daisuke Takagi
 Naomichi Ueda
 Antonio Briseño
 Marco Bueno
 Kevin Escamilla
 Alfonso González
 Memphis Depay
 Kyle Ebecilio
 Danzell Gravenberch
 Jordan Vale
 Jo Kwang
 Ju Jong-Chol
 Kang Nam-Gwon
 Alejandro Guido
 Esteban Rodriguez
 Rodrigo Aguirre
 Santiago Charamoni
 Juan Cruz Mascia
 Maximiliano Moreira
 Leonardo Pais
 Juan San Martín
 Gastón Silva
 Bobir Davlatov
 Davlatbek Yarbekov

1 own goal

 Connor Chapman (against Uzbekistan)
 Kip Colvey (against Japan)
 Jong Kwang-Sok (against Mexico)

References

External links

FIFA U-17 World Cup Mexico 2011, FIFA.com
FIFA Technical Report

2011
FIFA U-17 World Cup
FIFA U-17 World Cup
2011 FIFA U-17 World Cup
June 2011 sports events in Mexico
July 2011 sports events in Mexico